Kids Code Jeunesse (KCJ) is a Canadian not for profit organization based in Montreal, Quebec, which helps children in Canada have an opportunity to learn computational thinking through code. The organization was founded in 2013 .

Projects

Code Club
In 2016, in partnership with Code Club U.K., KCJ licensed the rights to Code Club Canada, which runs volunteer-led Code Clubs for free across Canada. There are now over 750 Code Clubs registered throughout every province and territory. These clubs are run for children aged 7–12 in schools, libraries and community centres for 8 weeks.

Code Create Teach
In 2016, Kids Code Jeunesse, in partnership with Lighthouse Labs, embarked on a national campaign to inspire teachers to incorporate the basics of coding and computational thinking into their classrooms. From April to December 2018, KCJ will be hosting free, full-day Code Create Teach workshops which will provide K-12 educators with the tools to help them teach their students how to experiment with technology. Two workshops are planned for each Canadian province and territory allowing KCJ to reach over 1500 teachers. During the workshops, KCJ instructors provide tips and guidelines to bring coding into the classroom, as well as combine unplugged activities with hands-on coding activities. These methods gives attendees the opportunity to connect with other teachers in purposeful and learner-driven way. Following the Code Create Teach workshops, each teacher is given a free classroom kit of micro:bits, a pocket-sized programmable micro-controller designed to make learning and teaching code easy and fun.

Code MTL
In 2017, KCJ was contracted for CodeMTL, a project to deliver coding workshops to over 65 schools in the Commission Scolaire de Montréal, Quebec's largest school board.

CanCode
In January 2018, the Honourable Navdeep Bains, Canada's Minister of Innovation, Science and Economic Development announced that Kids Code Jeunesse was one of the recipients of the inaugural CanCode program. This program is part of the Canadian Government's Innovation and Skills Plan which has the stated intention to invest $50 million by March 2019 to increase the opportunities for children and teachers to master digital skills. With the funds received, Kids Code Jeunesse has been able to extend the training it provides to Canada's youth and aims to support over 70,000 children and 2000 teachers.

References

External links
Official website

Organizations established in 2013
2013 establishments in Quebec
Non-profit organizations based in Quebec
Educational organizations based in Quebec
Computer science education